Pardon The Expression! was an ITV sitcom made by Granada Television, that was first broadcast from Wednesday 2 June 1965 to Monday 27 June 1966. The sitcom was one of four spin-offs from the soap opera Coronation Street. Pardon the Expression itself had a spin-off: Turn Out the Lights, broadcast in 1967. There was not another spin-off until the 1980s with The Brothers McGregor, which reused two characters (played by different actors) who appeared in a single episode.

Leonard Swindley, played by Arthur Lowe was the central character. Formerly the manager of the fashion retail store "Gamma Garments" in Coronation Street, in this series he is the deputy manager of the department store Dobson and Hawks. His boss in the series was Ernest Parbold, played by Paul Dawkins, who was replaced by Wally Hunt, played by Robert Dorning, in series 2. Other regulars were Betty Driver as canteen lady Mrs Edgeley, and Joy Stewart as Miss Sinclair, the boss's secretary. Another member of the cast was John Le Mesurier, who later reunited with Arthur Lowe in the classic comedy Dad's Army.

Episodes

Series 1 (1965) 

"The First Day" (2 Jun 65)
"The Headmistress" (9 Jun 65)
"The Trouble With Ada" (16 Jun 65)
"Mannequin Parade" (23 Jun 65)
"The Dance" (30 Jun 65)
"The Wedding" (7 Jul 65)
"The Pensioner" (14 Jul 65)
"The Visitor" (21 Jul 65)
"Birthday Present" (28 Jul 65)
"Little Boy Lost" (4 Aug 65)
"The Old One Two" (11 Aug 65)
"The Brain Drain" (18 Aug 65)

Series 2 (1966) 

"The Economy Drive" (10 Jan 66)
"January Sale" (17 Jan 66)
"The Resignation" (24 Jan 66)
"Self Defence" (31 Jan 66)
"The Stocktaking" (7 Feb 66)
"The Home Help" (14 Feb 66)
"Big Hotel" (21 Feb 66)
"The Gaol Birds" (28 Feb 66)
"A Night To Remember" (7 Mar 66)
"Whose Baby Are You?" (21 Mar 66)
"The Take-Over Bid" (28 Mar 66)
"Between The Covers" (4 Apr 66)
"Heads Down" (11 Apr 66)
"A Sheik In The Night" (18 Apr 66)
"Rustle Of Spring" (25 Apr 66)
"The Ghost Of Batsworth Castle" (2 May 66)
"The Sailor Home From The Sea" (9 May 66)
"The Dinner Party" (16 May 66)
"Man's Best Friend" (23 May 66)
"Thunderfinger – Part 1" (30 May 66)
"Thunderfinger – Part 2: Swindley Strikes Back" (6 Jun 66)
"The Switched-On Scene" (13 Jun 66)
"The Cup That Cheers" (20 Jun 66)
"On Health Farm Sommet Stirs" (27 Jun 66)

DVD release
Both series of Pardon the Expression were released (separately) in 2009, A 6-Disc set of the complete series has been released on 12 December 2011, just two years later.

External links

Pardon the Expression review

1960s British sitcoms
1965 British television series debuts
1966 British television series endings
ITV sitcoms
Television shows produced by Granada Television
Television series by ITV Studios
English-language television shows
Black-and-white British television shows
British television spin-offs
Coronation Street spin-offs